Elections were held in the Australian state of Queensland on 11 March 1902 to elect the members of the state's Legislative Assembly.

Key dates
This was the first Queensland general election to be conducted on a single day. In the past, due to problems of distance and communications, it was not possible to hold the elections on a single day.

Results

|}

See also
 Members of the Queensland Legislative Assembly, 1902–1904

References

Elections in Queensland
1902 elections in Australia
March 1902 events
1900s in Queensland